Walkin (PRLP 7076) is a Miles Davis compilation album released in March 1957 by Prestige Records. The album compiles material previously released on two 10 inch LPs in 1954 (Miles Davis All-Star Sextet and Side One of Miles Davis Quintet, dropping "I'll Remember April" from Side Two (which had been on the 12" LP Blue Haze, released the previous year, itself a collection of tunes from previous 10" LPs) and replacing it with the previously unreleased "Love Me or Leave Me" recorded at the same session. Here credited to the "Miles Davis All-Stars", the songs were recorded on 3 April and 29 April 1954 by two slightly different groups led by Davis. Both sessions were recorded at Rudy Van Gelder's home studio.

The earlier session was a quintet with David Schildkraut on alto saxophone, and produced the three tracks on side two. Schildkraut is the only musician not credited on the cover, and is otherwise almost unknown. Two of these tracks were originally released on the 10" LP Miles Davis Quintet, Prestige PRLP 185. The earlier release also included "I'll Remember April", recorded at the same time, now found on the Prestige album Blue Haze (PRLP 7054). Another tune from this session, "Love Me or Leave Me", was previously unreleased and substituted here for "I'll Remember April".

The second session, which makes up all of side one, was a sextet with J. J. Johnson on trombone and Lucky Thompson on tenor saxophone. The rhythm section was the same as the earlier session. These two tracks were originally issued on the 10" LP Miles Davis All-Star Sextet PRLP 182. The album's title track, a staple of Davis's live set for many years, was key to the emerging hard bop approach developed in the mid-1950s, Davis providing it with an anthem. The composition has been attributed by various sources to Jimmy Mundy, Miles Davis, and Gene Ammons. The copyright registration listed the composer as Richard E. Carpenter, a businessman and artist manager who had professional relationships with Mundy and Tadd Dameron, and was not known to be a musician or composer.

"Solar" was attributed to Davis and copyrighted in his name in 1963. Evidence revealed in 2012 showed that it is nearly identical to "Sonny", a piece written by guitarist Chuck Wayne in the 1940s, so Wayne is regarded as the composer of "Solar".

Track listing

Side one

Side two

Personnel
 Miles Davis – trumpet
 Lucky Thompson – tenor saxophone on side one
 J. J. Johnson – trombone on side one
 David Schildkraut – alto saxophone on side two
 Horace Silver – piano
 Percy Heath – bass
 Kenny Clarke – drums

References

1957 compilation albums
Miles Davis albums
Prestige Records compilation albums
Albums produced by Bob Weinstock
Albums recorded at Van Gelder Studio
Instrumental albums